Hase-dera is a Buddhist temple located in Sakurai, Nara Prefecture, Japan. It can also refer to:

 Hase-dera (Kamakura) in Kamakura, Kanagawa Prefecture
 Iiyama Kannon in Atsugi, Kanagawa Prefecture
 Hase-dera (Nagano) in Nagano, Nagano Prefecture